The Ao or Central Naga languages are a small family of Sino-Tibetan languages spoken by various Naga peoples of Nagaland in northeast India. Conventionally classified as "Naga", they are not clearly related to other Naga languages, and are conservatively classified as an independent branch of Sino-Tibetan, pending further research. There are around 607,000 speakers of the languages in total.

Coupe (2012) considers the Angami–Pochuri languages to be most closely related to Ao as part of a wider Angami–Ao group.

Languages
The following languages are widely accepted as Central Naga languages:
 Ao language
 Chungli Ao 
 Mongsen Ao
Sangtam ('Thukumi')
Yimkhiungrü ('Yachumi')
Lotha (Lhota)
There are also various undescribed Ao varieties including Yacham and Tengsa, which may turn out to be separate languages (see Mongsen Ao).

The following "Naga" languages spoken in and around Leshi Township, Myanmar are classified as Ao languages ("Ao-Yimkhiungrü") by Saul (2005).
Koki
Makury
Long Phuri
Para

Hsiu (2021) places Makury, Long Phuri, and Para into a Greater Central Naga branch, but excludes Koki (Kokak).

Greater Central Naga
Makury
Long Phuri
Para (Jejara)
Central Naga
Lotha
Sangtam
Yimchungrü
Ao

Bruhn (2014:370) also surmises that Makury may be an Ao language.

Bruhn (2014) uses the term Central Naga to refer to all of the languages above, and uses the Ao to refer to only two languages, namely Chungli Ao and Mongsen Ao. The internal structure of Bruhn's Central Naga group is as follows.
Central Naga
Lotha
Sangtam
Yimkhiungrü
Ao
Chungli Ao
Mongsen Ao

Reconstruction
Proto-Central Naga (Proto-Ao) has been reconstructed by Bruhn (2014).

Bruhn (2014:363) identifies the following four sound changes from Proto-Tibeto-Burman (PTB) to Proto-Central Naga (PCN) as sound changes that are characteristic of the Central Naga branch.
PTB *-a(ː)w, *-əw, *-ow, *-u > PCN *-u(ʔ) ‘back diphthong merger’
PTB *-r > PCN *-n ‘*r-coda nasalization’
PTB *-s > PCN *-t ‘*s-coda occlusivization’
PTB *-i(ː)l, *‑al, *‑uːl > PCN *‑ə(ʔ) ‘*l-rime erosion’

See also
 Ao Naga
 Lotha Naga
 Sangtam Naga
 T Senka Ao
 Yimkhiung Naga

References

van Driem, George (2001). Languages of the Himalayas: An Ethnolinguistic Handbook of the Greater Himalayan Region. Leiden: Brill.
Bruhn, Daniel Wayne. 2014. A Phonological Reconstruction of Proto-Central Naga. Ph.D. dissertation. University of California, Berkeley.
Saul, J. D. 2005. The Naga of Burma: Their festivals, customs and way of life. Bangkok, Thailand: Orchid Press.
Barkman, Tiffany. 2014. A descriptive grammar of Jejara (Para Naga). MA thesis, Chiang Mai: Payap University.
Shi, Vong Tsuh. 2009. Discourse studies of Makuri Naga narratives . MA thesis, Chiang Mai: Payap University.
Language and Social Development Organization (LSDO). 2006. A sociolinguistic survey of Makuri, Para, and Long Phuri Naga in Layshi Township, Myanmar. Unpublished manuscript.
Mills, J. P (1926). The Ao Nagas. London: MacMillan & Co.

 
Languages of India